López  is one of the 67 municipalities of Chihuahua, in northern Mexico. The municipal seat lies at Villa López. The municipality covers an area of 1,317.1 km².

As of 2010, the municipality had a total population of 4,025, up from 3,914 as of 2005. 

The municipality had 109 localities, the largest of which (with 2010 population in parentheses) was: Octaviano López (2,148).

Geography

Towns and villages
The municipality has 40 localities. The largest are:

References

Municipalities of Chihuahua (state)